Victor Benjamin Neuburg (6 May 1883 – 31 May 1940) was an English poet and writer. He also wrote on the subjects of theosophy and occultism. He was an associate of Aleister Crowley and the publisher of the early works of Pamela Hansford Johnson and Dylan Thomas.

Early life
Neuburg was born into and raised in an upper middle-class Jewish family in Islington. His father, Carl Neuburg, who had been born in 1857 in Pilsen, Bohemia, and was a commission agent based in Vienna, abandoned the family shortly after his son's birth. Victor was brought up by his mother, Jeanette Neuburg, née Jacobs (1855–1939), and his maternal aunts. He was educated at the City of London School and Trinity College, Cambridge, where he studied medieval and modern languages.

Relationship with Aleister Crowley
When he was 25, in around 1906, Neuburg came in contact with Crowley, also a poet, who had read some of Neuburg's pieces in the Agnostic Journal. Crowley's description of him was:

He was an agnostic, a vegetarian, a mystic, a Tolstoyan, and several other things all at once. He endeavoured to express his spiritual state by wearing the green star of Esperanto, though he could not speak the language; by refusing to wear a hat, even in London, to wash, and to wear trousers. Whenever addressed, he wriggled convulsively, and his lips, which were three times too large for him, and had been put on hastily as an afterthought, emitted the most extraordinary laugh that had ever come my way; to these advantages he united those of being extraordinarily well-read, overflowing with exquisitely subtle humour, and being one of the best natured people that ever trod this planet.

Crowley initiated Neuburg into his magical Order, the A∴A∴, in which he took the magical name "Frater Omnia Vincam". Crowley also began a long-lasting sentimental and sexual relationship with Neuburg. In 1909 Crowley took Neuburg to Algiers, and they set off into the desert, where they performed a series of occult rituals based on the Enochian system of Doctor John Dee, later chronicled in The Vision and the Voice. In the midst of these rituals Crowley put the ideas of sex and magick together, and performed his first "Sex Magick" ritual. Neuburg's anthology of poems The Triumph of Pan (1910) dates from shortly after these events and shows the distinct influence of Crowley:

Sweet Wizard, in whose footsteps I have trod
Unto the shrine of the most obscene god,
So steep the pathway is, I may not know,
Until I reach the summit where I go.

Crowley was highly impressed by Neuburg's poetic ability:

...in the next few years he produced some of the finest poetry of which the English language can boast. He had an extraordinary delicacy of rhythm, an unrivalled sense of perception, a purity and intensity of passion second to none, and a remarkable command of the English language.

Back in London, Neuburg showed potential as a dancer, so Crowley gave him a leading role in his proto-performance art pieces Rites of Eleusis. Neuburg also pursued a doomed relationship with the actress Ione de Forest, who committed suicide shortly after their break-up. In 1913 Crowley and Neuburg again joined forces in a sexual ritual magic operation known as "the Paris Working". Neuburg appears to have broken with Crowley some time in 1914, before Crowley left on an extended tour of the United States. Neuburg may have suffered a nervous breakdown. According to one of Crowley's biographers, Lawrence Sutin, Crowley used anti-Semitic epithets to bully Neuburg: "Crowley leveled numerous brutal verbal attacks on Neuburg's family and Jewish ancestry ...".
In 1930 Crowley wrote of Neuburg:

A sausage-lipped songster of Steyning
Was solemnly bent on attaining
But he broke all the rules
About managing tools
And so broke down in the training.

The Vine Press and "The Poet's Corner"
From 1916 Neuburg served in the British Army. After the end of the First World War he moved to Steyning in Sussex, where he ran a small press, the Vine Press. In 1920 he published a collection of ballads and other verse under the title Lillygay. Many of these were adapted from earlier ballad collections. In 1923 Peter Warlock set five of these verses to music under the same title.

From 1933 onwards Neuburg edited a section called "The Poet's Corner" in a British newspaper, the Sunday Referee. Here he encouraged new talent by awarding weekly prizes. One prize went to the then-unknown Dylan Thomas and the publisher of the Sunday Referee sponsored Thomas's first book, 18 Poems.

Later life
Neuburg married Kathleen Rose Goddard in 1921, but the marriage eventually broke up. They had a son, Victor Edward Neuburg (1924–1996), who became a writer on English literature.

Neuburg later started a relationship with Runia Tharpe, and moved to Swiss Cottage, London, to live with her.

In 1937 Jean Overton Fuller submitted a poem to "The Poets' Corner" and was drawn into Neuburg's circle, eventually becoming his biographer.

Death
Victor Benjamin Neuburg died from tuberculosis on 30 May 1940. Dylan Thomas declared on hearing of Neuburg's death:

Vicky encouraged me as no one else has done ... He possessed many kinds of genius, and not the least was his genius for drawing to himself, by his wisdom, graveness, great humour and innocence, a feeling of trust and love that won’t ever be forgotten.

Works
Neuburg's books include The Green Garland (1908), The Triumph of Pan (1910), Lillygay: An Anthology of Anonymous Poems (1920), Swift Wings: Songs in Sussex (1921), Songs of the Groves (1921), and Larkspur: A Lyric Garland (1922).

See also

Vittoria Cremers
Aleister Crowley

References

Further reading

McNeff, Richard. "Victor Neuberg: The Triumph of Pan." Wormwood (ed. Mark Valentine) No 5 (Autumn 2005): 32-39.

1883 births
1940 deaths
20th-century deaths from tuberculosis
English Jews
English Thelemites
Jewish poets
People from Islington (district)
People from Steyning
English male poets
20th-century English poets
Tuberculosis deaths in England